A Couple More Years is an album by Ronnie Drew and Eleanor Shanley, released in 2000.

Eleanor Shanley was a member of De Danann, who had recorded Bob Dylan's "Boots of Spanish Leather" with The Dubliners on their 30 Years A-Greying album.  Also featured are Mike Hanrahan and Bill Shanley as backup guitarists. A video of this show was also released.

"A Couple More Years" was written by Shel Silverstein and  Dennis Locorriere and has been recorded by artists including Dr Hook (Locorriere's band) and Willie Nelson.

Track listing
Source: iTunes

References

Ronnie Drew albums
2000 live albums